Oral Fixation, Vol. 2 (Spanish: Fijación Oral, Vol. 2) is the seventh studio album and second English-language album by Colombian singer and songwriter Shakira, released on 28 November 2005, by Epic Records. After attaining international success with her fifth studio effort, Laundry Service (2001), Shakira decided to create a two-part follow-up record. She released the project as the follow-up to her sixth studio effort, Fijación Oral, Vol. 1, with which she had attained international success five months prior. As co-producer, Shakira enlisted producers including previous collaborators Gustavo Cerati, Lester Mendez, Luis Fernando Ochoa and Rick Rubin to work alongside newer partners Jerry Duplessis, Wyclef Jean, Tim Mitchell and The Matrix.

Musically the album follows in the vein of her earlier works: heavily influenced by Latin pop styles, it additionally incorporates elements of dance-pop and pop rock. Upon its release, Oral Fixation, Vol. 2 received generally favorable reviews from music critics, who complimented it as her strongest project to date. The album debuted at number five on the US Billboard 200 with first-week sales of 128,000 copies. The album was later certified platinum by the Recording Industry Association of America (RIAA) and has sold over 1.7 million units in the country. It additionally topped charts in Denmark and Mexico.

Three singles were released from the album. Its lead single, "Don't Bother", reached number 42 on the US Billboard Hot 100. The second single, "Hips Don't Lie", peaked at number 1 in the US, becoming her first single to do so. The third and final single, "Illegal", peaked at number 1 on the Billboard Hot Dance Club Songs component chart.  The album was reissued in 2006 due to slow sales with a revised tracklist and two added tracks: "Hips Don't Lie" and an alternate version of "La Tortura". In December 2006, the album was included in a box set along with Fijación Oral, Vol. 1, titled Oral Fixation, Vol. 1 & 2. Both projects were promoted through the Oral Fixation Tour, which visited 39 countries throughout 2006 and 2007.

Background

After attaining international success with her third studio effort, Laundry Service, in 2001, Shakira opted to create a two-part follow-up record. Having co-written nearly sixty tracks for Laundry Service, she put herself "on the mission of selecting [her] favorite ones" to record for Oral Fixation, Vol. 2 and its predecessor, the Spanish-language Fijación Oral, Vol. 1. While recording the project, Shakira worked with previous collaborators Gustavo Cerati, Lester Mendez, Luis Fernando Ochoa and Rick Rubin, and newer partners Jerry Duplessis, Wyclef Jean, Tim Mitchell and The Matrix.

For the album, Shakira wrote all the lyrics, and the majority of the music. "To start seeing people's first reactions, and how people start relating to these songs and appreciating every single piece of work I have done over the past two years, is the best reward an artist can have after so much hard work," says Shakira. "I will not lie to you; it was not a path of roses. It was painful at times to come up with two albums, to write more than 60 songs and to fight my own insecurities and doubts." While speaking about the difference about expressing herself in Spanish and English, Shakira said, "When I express myself in Spanish, I find elements that help me express an idea in perhaps a different way than when I do it in English. There are different aesthetics, but there is a certain style to the way I write my own songs, a particular way of describing feelings and emotions that I have developed over all these years making songs. I have gotten in touch with my own gift - I am sure, 10 years ago, I was not half as good as I can say I am today, and I am still not good enough. There is a long way to go."

Cover art

Shakira designed the artwork for both Oral Fixation records, and commented that they were inspired by the biblical figure of Eve, elaborating that she wanted "to attribute to Eve one more reason to bite the forbidden fruit, and that would be her oral fixation" and that "[she always felt] that [she has] been a very oral person. [It is her] biggest source of pleasure". The second volume's cover sees an unclothed Shakira covered by a tree's branches and leaves while holding an apple in her hand. The baby girl she held in her arms on the cover of the first volume is sitting in the tree, alluding to psychoanalyst Sigmund Freud's theory that infants begin discovering the world through their mouths during the oral stage of psychosexual development.

For Jon Pareles of The New York Times, "For obvious reasons, it's eye-catching, as was the cover of the Spanish-language companion album, Fijación Oral, Vol. 1". On Middle East versions of the album, Shakira was covered up with leaves which left her standing behind a bush, which surprised the singer. Complex magazine selected the album cover as the eleventh "sexiest album cover of all time", writing that it is "the hottest portrayal of Eve in the Garden of Eden we can imagine." Maxim also listed the album's cover as one of the "sexiest album covers", writing that, "A naked girl holding up an apple in a garden is played out, but not when the girl is hip-shaking Shakira. Damn, it could happen all over again, couldn't it?"

Music and lyrics

For Stephen Thomas Erlewine of AllMusic, the album touches on everything from the expected Latin rhythms to glitzy Euro disco, trashy American rock & roll, and stomping Britpop, all punctuated by some stark confessionals. "How Do You Do" is a bold opening track that features Gregorian chants and an eerie reciting of "The Lord's Prayer" before thrusting the listener into a song similar to Sarah McLachlan's 'Dear God', according to Kristina Weise of Songwriting Universe. It presents bitter questions regarding faith and religion. The lyrics say, "How many people die and hurt in your name?/Hey does that make you proud, or does it bring you shame?" Shakira affirms, "I decided in the bridge of the song to include chants from different religions like Islam, Judaism and Christianity. And the three chanters are saying basically the same: they are asking for forgiveness," she said off the track.

The first single, "Don't Bother", presents the final chapter of a relationship and the confusion that faces anyone in a break-up. It includes the lyrics, "For you I'd give up all I own and move to a communist country/If you came with me, of course/And I'd file my nails so they don't hurt you." She quickly follows with: "And after all I'm glad I am not your type/I promise you won't see me cry/So don't bother/I'll be fine, I'll be fine." For Shakira, "I think 'Don't Bother' has a lot of pain in it as a song, but also a lot of humor and sarcasm. Yes, it is a way of exorcising all of these feelings, a form of catharsis, getting rid of all of those emotions that torture us women at some point in our lives."
"Illegal" features a guitar solo by Mexican guitarist Carlos Santana, and features lyrics such as, "You said you would love me until you died/And as far as I know you're still alive", which were compared to Alanis Morissette's "You Oughta Know", according to Stephen Thomas Erlewine of AllMusic.

"I'd like to be the owner of the zipper on your jeans," she sings on the racy "Hey You," which was compared to the works of American rock band No Doubt, by Slant Magazine. Mariachi horns bump up against surf guitars in "Animal City", a don't-go-there warning against fame and fake friends, while bossa nova accents wind through "Something", one of only two tracks reprised from Fijación Oral, being called En Tus Pupilas on the first edition. "The Day and the Time" is on the first edition, with the title "Día Especial". Meanwhile, gypsy-caravan violin and marauder guitar complete "Your Embrace," a teardroppy, adult-contemporary ballad, whilst "Costume Makes the Clown" talks about her cheating on her guy, over battering-ram guitars. Shakira also dives into pulsating neo-disco on the closing track, "Timor", but in the form of a protest song.

Critical reception

At Metacritic, which assigns a normalized rating out of 100 to reviews from mainstream critics, "Oral Fixation" received an average score of 74 based on 15 reviews, indicating "generally favorable reviews". Stephen Thomas Erlewine of Allmusic gave the album a rating of 4 stars (out of 5), calling it "a deadly serious, ambitious pop/rock album, most assuredly not frivolous dance-pop, [...] it's pop, but it's unconventional". Erlewine also wrote that Oral Fixation "is not only a markedly different album from Fijación Oral, but from every other record in her catalog -- or, most importantly, from any other pop album in 2005." Matt Cibula of PopMatters agreed, writing that Oral Fixation is "the best pop record of the year". Alexis Petridis of The Guardian wrote that "Oral Fixation is the sound of an utterly unique voice in a uniform world." Agustin Gurza of the Los Angeles Times wrote the album "is a stronger work as a whole, with sharper edges and darker undertones," praising its music, writing that "this work stands on its own, squarely within the mainstream of U.S. pop and rock with a lot less Latin flavor."

David Browne of Entertainment Weekly gave the album a B- rating, writing that, "Although Oral Fixation is hardly the first time a Latina act has aimed straight for the middle of the North American road and nearly lost control of the wheel in the process, it's among the most disappointing. For all the musical ingredients at her disposal, Shakira winds up with a relatively bland dish." Sal Cinquemani of Slant Magazine wrote that the weakest part in some songs on the album are "the main(stream) hook, an attempt at radio-accessibility that white-washes the personality that sets Shakira apart from her competition." Barry Walters of Rolling Stone acknowledged that, "Occasionally clumsy but most often clever, Shakira's English lyrics and performances still lack the confidence of her Spanish tracks, yet Oral Fixation manages to maintain the musical credibility that Fijacion Oral won back." Edward Oculicz of Stylus Magazine concluded that, "Oral Fixation Volume 2 strikes a good balance between the creative audacity of its more extreme songs, all of which work as good pop, and the filler, which is well crafted and catchy."

Commercial performance 
In the United States, Oral Fixation, Vol. 2 debuted at number 5 on the Billboard 200 with first-week sales of 128,000 copies. Due to the success of "Hips Don't Lie" from the album reissue, the album moved from number 98 to number 6 on the week of May 6, 2006, selling 81,000 copies. By 2007, the album sold over 1.7 million units in the country. The album was certified Platinum by the RIAA in the United States. Shakira received 18 Platinum certifications for the sales of Oral Fixation, Vol. 2 in the following countries: Canada, Mexico, Austria, Germany, Hungary, Italy, Norway, Portugal, Spain, Switzerland, Argentina, Peru, Chile, India, Greece, United States, United Kingdom, and her home country, Colombia. Oral Fixation, Vol. 2 was named the ninth best selling album of 2006 worldwide. Also it was the 23rd best selling album in the United States of 2006. After the performance of "Hips Don't Lie" at the 2006 MTV Video Music Awards, which featured Shakira dancing in an Indian outfit, the album topped India Charts and was certified Platinum selling 80,000 units. In April 2007 Oral Fixation, Vol. 2 re-entered the UK Albums Chart at #70 the same week that "Beautiful Liar", Shakira's duet with Beyoncé, entered the singles charts at No. 10 solely through downloads. It later moved to #69. The album was also certified Platinum in the UK in April 2007.

Promotion

To further promote Fijación Oral, Vol. 1 and Oral Fixation, Vol. 2, Shakira embarked on the Oral Fixation Tour. It was launched on 14 June 2006, at the Feria De Muestras in Zaragoza, Spain. With the assistance of the Creative Artists Agency, she visited ninety-four cities and performed forty-one shows across five continents. The tour concluded on 9 July 2007, at the Turkcell Kuruçeşme Arena in Istanbul, Turkey. It grossed over $42 million in North and Latin America, and grossed $100 million worldwide. The set list primarily consisted of Spanish-language tracks, and additionally included earlier singles from Shakira's albums Pies Descalzos (1996), Dónde Están los Ladrones? (1998), and Laundry Service (2001).

In November 2007, Epic Records released the Oral Fixation Tour live album, filmed during a show in Miami, Florida in December 2006. Robert Silva from About.com provided a positive review, describing the recording as a "very entertaining and lively performance"; he expressed an additional interest in the bonus behind-the-scenes footage. William Ruhlmann from Allmusic shared a similar sentiment, complimenting her vocals and dancing abilities.

Singles
The lead single, "Don't Bother", was released on 4 October 2005. The song received mixed reviews from music critics, who were ambivalent towards its production and songwriting. Commercially, the song was a moderate success, reaching the top ten in Austria, Germany, Italy, Switzerland and UK, while it only peaked at number 42 in the US, reaching a lower peak than "La Tortura", the lead single of Fijación Oral.

After the moderate success of "Don't Bother" and of the album, her label Epic Records asked Wyclef Jean, in early 2006, to remake his song "Dance Like This" with Shakira, attempting to revive sales of the album. After that, "Hips Don't Lie" was released as the second single from the album (first from the reissue) on 28 February 2006. The song received positive reviews from critics, while it gained 6 awards. Commercially, the single proved to be more successful than "Don't Bother", peaking at number one in more than 13 countries, including Australia, France, Ireland, the UK and the US, becoming her most successful single to date.

The third and final single, "Illegal", was released on 14 November 2006. The song received favorable reviews from music critics, due to the inclusion of Carlos Santana on it. However, the song didn't perform well on the charts, after the huge success of "Hips Don't Lie", only managing to peak inside the top ten in Austria, Italy and the Netherlands, while elsewhere it reached the top forty, including the UK. In the US, the song didn't enter the Billboard Hot 100 chart.

Track listing
Credits adapted from the liner notes of Oral Fixation, Vol. 2.

Notes
 signifies a co-producer
 signifies an additional producer
 signifies a pre-producer

Charts

Weekly charts

Year-end charts

Certifications and sales

References

2005 albums
Albums produced by Jerry Duplessis
Albums produced by the Matrix (production team)
Albums produced by Rick Rubin
Albums produced by Wyclef Jean
Albums recorded at The Warehouse Studio
Epic Records albums
Sequel albums
Shakira albums